The second cabinet of Petre P. Carp was the government of Romania from 29 December 1910 to 27 March 1912.

Ministers
The ministers of the cabinet were as follows:

President of the Council of Ministers:
Petre P. Carp (29 December 1910 - 27 March 1912)
Minister of the Interior: 
Alexandru Marghiloman (29 December 1910 - 27 March 1912)
Minister of Foreign Affairs: 
Titu Maiorescu (29 December 1910 - 27 March 1912)
Minister of Finance:
Petre P. Carp (29 December 1910 - 27 March 1912)
Minister of Justice:
Mihail G. Cantacuzino (29 December 1910 - 27 March 1912)
Minister of War:
Nicolae Filipescu (29 December 1910 - 27 March 1912)
Minister of Religious Affairs and Public Instruction:
Constantin C. Arion (29 December 1910 - 27 March 1912)
Minister of Industry and Commerce:
Dimitrie Nenițescu (29 December 1910 - 27 March 1912)
Minister of Agriculture and Property:
Ion Lahovari (29 December 1910 - 27 March 1912)
Minister of Public Works:
Barbu Delavrancea (29 December 1910 - 27 March 1912)

References

Cabinets of Romania
Cabinets established in 1910
Cabinets disestablished in 1912
1910 establishments in Romania
1912 disestablishments in Romania